The Newcomes: Memoirs of a Most Respectable Family is a novel by William Makepeace Thackeray, first published in 1854 and 1855.

Publication
The Newcomes was published serially over about two years, as Thackeray himself says in one of the novel's final chapters. The novel shows its serial origin: it is very long (an undated but clearly very old edition with tiny type fills 551 pages) and its events occur over many years and in several countries before the reader reaches the predictable conclusion. The main part of The Newcomes is set a decade or two after the action of Vanity Fair, and some of the characters in Vanity Fair are mentioned peripherally in The Newcomes. The narrator is Arthur Pendennis, the protagonist of Pendennis. It was illustrated by Richard Doyle, both in literal renderings of the scenes and in symbolic and fanciful depictions of events and characters.

Plot
The novel tells the story of Colonel Thomas Newcome, a virtuous and upstanding character.  It is equally the story of Colonel Newcome's son, Clive, who studies and travels for the purpose of becoming a painter, although the profession is frowned on by some of his relatives and acquaintances—notably Clive's snobbish, backstabbing cousin Barnes Newcome.

Colonel Newcome goes out to India for decades, then returns to England where Clive meets his cousin Ethel. After years in England, the colonel returns to India for another several years and while he is there, Clive travels Europe and his love for Ethel waxes and wanes. Dozens of background characters appear, fade, and reappear.

The colonel and Clive are only the central figures in The Newcomes, the action of which begins before the colonel's birth. Over several generations the Newcome family rises into wealth and respectability as bankers and begin to marry into the minor aristocracy. A theme that runs throughout the novel is the practice of marrying for money. Herein we find first use of the coined word "capitalism", as reference to an economic system. Religion is another theme, particularly Methodism.

Critical commentary

Perhaps one of the novel's greatest strengths is that it contains hundreds of references to the popular and educated culture of the time and thus gives a better idea than most contemporary novels of what it was like to live in England then— almost a miniature education in the Victorian era. Thackeray mentions poets, painters, novelists (some of the characters are reading Oliver Twist), politics, and other people, events and things both familiar and obscure to the 21st-century reader—and does so in a natural way that enhances the story. There are also plenty of Latin, French, Italian and ancient Greek phrases—all untranslated.

Colonel Newcome came to be an emblem of virtue for a period, often referred to at the turn of the 20th century. For example, in his autobiography, Theodore Roosevelt described his uncle, James Dunwoody Bulloch, as "a veritable Colonel Newcome".

Ethel Barrymore was named after the character in the novel.

See also

 1854 in literature
 1855 in literature

Notes

External links

 

1854 British novels
1855 British novels
Books illustrated by Richard Doyle
British novels adapted into plays
English novels
Novels by William Makepeace Thackeray
Novels first published in serial form
Novels set in England
Novels set in Europe
Novels set in India
Victorian novels